Vincent Grant Gill (born April 12, 1957) is an American country music singer, songwriter and musician. He has achieved commercial success and fame both as frontman of the country rock band Pure Prairie League in the 1970s and as a solo artist beginning in 1983, where his talents as a vocalist and musician have placed him in high demand as a guest vocalist and a duet partner.

He has recorded more than 20 studio albums, charted over 40 singles on the U.S. Billboard charts as Hot Country Songs, and has sold more than 26 million albums. He has been honored by the Country Music Association with 18 CMA Awards, including two Entertainer of the Year awards and five Male Vocalist Awards. As of 2022, Gill has also earned 22 Grammy Awards, more than any other male country music artist. In 2007 he was inducted into the Country Music Hall of Fame. In 2016, Gill was inducted into the Guitar Center Rock Walk by Joe Walsh of the Eagles. In 2017, he and Deacon Frey were hired by the Eagles in place of the late Glenn Frey.

Early life 
Gill was born in Norman, Oklahoma. He has an elder maternal half-brother, Bob Coen.

His father, J. Stanley Gill, was a lawyer and administrative law judge who played in a country music band part-time and encouraged Gill to pursue a music career. His father encouraged him to learn to play banjo and guitar, which he did along with bass, mandolin, Dobro and fiddle.

Gill attended high school at Oklahoma City's Northwest Classen High School. While there he played on the golf team and performed bluegrass in the band Mountain Smoke, which built a strong local following. After graduating from high school in 1975, he moved to Louisville, Kentucky, to join the band Bluegrass Alliance. Afterwards he spent a brief amount of time in Ricky Skaggs's Boone Creek band before moving to Los Angeles to join Sundance, a bluegrass group fronted by fiddler Byron Berline.

Career 

Gill debuted on the national scene with the country rock band Pure Prairie League in 1979, appearing on that band's album Can't Hold Back. He is the lead singer on their song "Let Me Love You Tonight". Mark Knopfler once invited him to join Dire Straits, but he declined the offer (although he sang backup on the Dire Straits' album On Every Street).

Gill left Pure Prairie League in 1981 to join Cherry Bombs, the stage band that backed Rodney Crowell. There he worked with Tony Brown and Emory Gordy Jr., both of whom would later produce many of his albums. He recorded a bluegrass album, Here Today, with David Grisman and friends before signing a solo deal with RCA with whom he achieved some success including the singles, "Victim of Life's Circumstance" (U.S. Country Top 40) and Country Top Ten with "If It Weren't for Him", "Oklahoma Borderline" and "Cinderella". However his albums achieved only moderate sales and in 1989, Gill left RCA to sign with MCA Records. Here, reunited with Tony Brown as producer, he sold over a million copies of his label debut, 1989's When I Call Your Name, of which several songs, including the title track, made the U.S. Country charts' Top Ten / Top Twenty. This was followed by the similarly successful albums, Pocket Full of Gold (1991) and I Still Believe in You, of which the title track went to U.S. Country No. 1.

Throughout the 1990s and into the 2000s Gill continued to release highly successful albums, capitalizing on the virtuoso quality of his electric and acoustic guitar playing, his pure, high and soulful tenor voice, and the excellent quality of his songwriting. According to his biography on AllMusic, Gill has won more CMA Awards than any performer in history, and as of 2018 has also won 21 Grammy Awards, which represents the most ever by a country artist.

Gill has been a member of the Grand Ole Opry since August 10, 1991. He celebrated his 25th Opry anniversary with a tribute show on August 13, 2016.

In 1997, he received the Golden Plate Award of the American Academy of Achievement.

In 2010, Gill officially joined the country swing group The Time Jumpers.

In July 2011, Gill appeared as a guest on NPR's news quiz show Wait, Wait...Don't Tell Me. Also in 2011, he appeared on the second of two bluegrass tribute albums for the British rock band the Moody Blues: Moody Bluegrass TWO... Much Love (2011). In May 2011, Carrie Underwood was one of the seven women to be honored by the Academy of Country Music at the Girls' Night Out: Superstar Women of Country special. At the ceremony, Gill introduced Underwood and presented her with the special award. He sang one of her hits, "Jesus, Take The Wheel", and joined Underwood on a rendition performance of "How Great Thou Art". The video of the performance went viral within two days.

In February 2012, Gill announced, "For the first time in 30 years, I don't have a record deal. Don't know that I want one."

In March 2012, he performed at the Southern Kentucky Performing Arts Center in Bowling Green, Kentucky, for its opening night. He was recruited for the show at the 11th hour when singer LeAnn Rimes canceled the day before the opening. Gill drove up from Nashville that night with only his guitar and played to repeated standing ovations from a standing-room only house.

In April 2012, it was confirmed that Gill had been working with Bonnie Tyler on her upcoming album, performing a duet with her entitled "What You Need from Me".

In June 2012, he was touring and performing only bluegrass songs.

Gill received the 2,478th star of the Hollywood Walk of Fame on September 6, 2012.

Gill was featured in a song by Kelly Clarkson titled "Don't Rush", which appears on Clarkson's Greatest Hits – Chapter One.

In 2014, Gill received the Country Music Awards Irving Waugh Award of Excellence. Gill was only the sixth recipient since the inception of the award in 1983..

In 2016, Gill was selected as one of 30 artists to perform on Forever Country, which celebrates 50 years of the CMA Awards.

In his career Gill has sold more than 26 million albums and accumulated more than 50 Top 40 hits.

Gill joined the Eagles, alongside Deacon Frey, following the death of Glenn Frey. Gill serves as co-lead guitarist, in addition to providing rhythm guitars, singing background, and frequently handling lead vocals in place of Glenn Frey's role. He initially started touring with the band in 2017, and continues to serve as a member of the band.

Personal life 

In 1968, Gill's older half-brother, Bob Coen, was involved in a severe car crash. Bob was 22 years old at the time, while Gill was 11. The accident left Bob in a coma for three months with irreversible brain damage. He subsequently struggled in life and would lose contact with his family and friends. He died in 1993. Gill wrote the song "It Won't Be the Same This Year" for his brother. He dedicated his 1993 Christmas album Let There Be Peace on Earth and his first televised Christmas special that year to Coen.

Gill met country music singer Janis Oliver of Sweethearts of the Rodeo in Los Angeles when they were both starting out in music. The two married in 1980. Their daughter Jenny was born in 1982. In 1983 the couple moved to Nashville. Gill worked as a session guitarist, sang back-up, and continued to write songs while his wife's career took off. Occasionally Gill would mix sound for his wife's band. The two divorced in 1997.

Gill met Christian music artist Amy Grant in 1993 when he asked her to perform in his first televised Christmas special. Grant and then husband Gary Chapman began divorce mediation in 1998, with Grant moving out of the home and filing for divorce in early 1999. The divorce was finalized in June 1999. Gill and Grant began to see each other publicly a few months later. In March 2000 they were married. Together they have one daughter, Corrina.

Gill has played golf since early childhood. A scratch golfer, he has organized and participated in many charity events centered around golf and was inducted into the Tennessee Golf Hall of Fame in 2005. In 1993 Gill founded the Vinny Pro-Celebrity Golf Invitational, which serves as the primary beneficiary for the Tennessee Golf Foundation. In 2003 the PGA awarded him the PGA Distinguished Service Award for his work in charity and in promoting junior golf. Gill was honored with the 2022 Old Tom Morris Award by the Golf Course Superintendents Association of America, for his lifetime commitment to the game of golf and help molding the welfare of the game. 

Gill is a member of the board of directors of the Nashville Predators Foundation charity organization, affiliated with the Nashville Predators National Hockey League team.

Gill currently lives in Nashville, Tennessee. He also has a home studio there.

Discography

Studio albums 

 The Things That Matter (1985)
 The Way Back Home (1987)
 When I Call Your Name (1989)
 Pocket Full of Gold (1991)
 I Still Believe in You (1992)
 Let There Be Peace on Earth (1993)
 When Love Finds You (1994)
 Souvenirs (1995)
 High Lonesome Sound (1996)
 The Key (1998)
 Breath of Heaven: A Christmas Collection (1998)
 Let's Make Sure We Kiss Goodbye (2000)
 'Tis the Season (with Olivia Newton-John) (2000)
 Next Big Thing (2003)
 These Days (2006)
 Guitar Slinger (2011)
 Bakersfield (2013)
 Down to My Last Bad Habit (2016)
 Okie (2019)

Selected awards and honors

Academy of Country Music 

 1984 Top New Male Vocalist
 1992 Song of the Year with John Barlow Jarvis – "I Still Believe in You"
 1992 Top Male Vocalist
 1993 Top Male Vocalist

Country Music Association 

 1990 Single of the Year – "When I Call Your Name"
 1991 Male Vocalist of the Year
 1992 Male Vocalist of the Year
 1992 Song of the Year with Max D. Barnes – "Look at Us"
 1993 Album of the Year – "I Still Believe in You"
 1993 Male Vocalist of the Year
 1993 Song of the Year with John Barlow Jarvis – "I Still Believe in You"
 1993 Entertainer of the Year
 1994 Entertainer of the Year
 1994 Male Vocalist of the Year
 1995 Male Vocalist of the Year
 1999 Vocal Event of the Year with Patty Loveless – "My Kind of Woman, My Kind of Man"
 2014 Award of Excellence
 2017 Humanitarian Award

Grammy Awards 

Gill has won 22 awards from 44 nominations.

 1990 Best Country Vocal Performance, Male – "When I Call Your Name"
 1991 Best Country Vocal Collaboration with Ricky Skaggs and Steve Wariner – "Restless"
 1992 Best Country Song with John Barlow Jarvis – "I Still Believe in You"
 1992 Best Country Vocal Performance, Male – "I Still Believe in You"
 1993 Best Country Instrumental Performance with Asleep at the Wheel, Chet Atkins, Eldon Shamblin, Johnny Gimble, Marty Stuart, and Reuben "Lucky Oceans" Gosfield – "Red Wing"
 1994 Best Country Vocal Performance, Male – "When Love Finds You"
 1995 Best Country Song – "Go Rest High on That Mountain"
 1995 Best Male Country Vocal Performance – "Go Rest High on That Mountain"
 1996 Best Male Country Vocal Performance – "Worlds Apart"
 1996 Best Country Collaboration with Vocals with Alison Krauss and Union Station – "High Lonesome Sound"
 1997 Best Country Instrumental Performance with Randy Scruggs – "A Soldier's Joy"
 1997 Best Male Country Vocal Performance – "Pretty Little Adriana"
 1998 Best Male Country Vocal Performance – "If You Ever Have Forever in Mind"
 1999 Best Country Instrumental Performance with Tommy Allsup, Asleep at the Wheel, Floyd Domino, Larry Franklin, and Steve Wariner – "Bob's Breakdowns"
 2001 Best Country Instrumental Performance with Jerry Douglas, Glen Duncan, Albert Lee, Steve Martin, Leon Russell, Earl Scruggs, Gary Scruggs, Randy Scruggs, Paul Shaffer and Marty Stuart – "Foggy Mountain Breakdown"
 2002 Best Male Country Vocal Performance – "The Next Big Thing"
 2005 Best Country Gospel Album – "Rock of Ages... Hymns and Faith"
 2006 Best Male Country Vocal Performance – "The Reason Why"
 2007 Best Country Album – "These Days"
 2008 Best Country Instrumental Performance with Brad Paisley, James Burton, John Jorgenson, Albert Lee, Brent Mason, Redd Volkaert and Steve Wariner – "Cluster Pluck"
 2017 Best American Roots Song – "Kid Sister"
 2021 Best Country Solo Performance – "When My Amy Prays"

Hall of fame inductions 

 1997: Oklahoma Hall of Fame
 2005: Nashville Songwriters Hall of Fame
 2007: Country Music Hall of Fame
 2012: Hollywood Walk of Fame

See also 
 Best selling music artists

References

External links 

 
 How to Capture Vince Gill's Guitar Tone
 Encyclopedia of Oklahoma History and Culture – Gill, Vince

1957 births
American country guitarists
American country mandolinists
American country singer-songwriters
American male guitarists
American male singer-songwriters
American mandolinists
American session musicians
Country Music Hall of Fame inductees
Country musicians from Oklahoma
Country pop musicians
Grammy Award winners
Grand Ole Opry members
Living people
MCA Records artists
Members of the Country Music Association
Musicians from Norman, Oklahoma
Northwest Classen High School alumni
RCA Records Nashville artists
Resonator guitarists
Singer-songwriters from Oklahoma
The Notorious Cherry Bombs members
Guitarists from Oklahoma
20th-century American guitarists
20th-century American male musicians
Eagles (band) members
Pure Prairie League members
Lyle Lovett and His Large Band members